Solariella nanshaensis is a species of sea snail, a marine gastropod mollusk in the family Solariellidae.

Description

Distribution

References

External links

nanshaensis
Gastropods described in 2002